Eleanor Cassar is a Maltese singer that won the Golden Stag Festival 2004.

Born on September 29, 1982, Eleanor Cassar has been singing since she was 11 years old. She was first noticed by her teacher in Secondary school that encouraged her at participate at musical and theatrical events. The same teacher encouraged her to take singing seriously.

Later Eleanor got a certificate of merit from the University of London.

In 2002, she won the first prize at The People's Song Festival. In 2001, Eleanor won the first prize at the Discovery Song Festival in Varna, Bulgaria.

In 2003, she participated for the first time at the Song for Europe Festival with two songs: Someday You'll See and Tell Me Why.

The year 2004 was a successful year for Eleanor. She won the first prize at the Super One festival but also the prize for Best Interpretation offered by FIDOF.

Eleanor has become one of the most popular singers in Malta and she has several weekly appearances on local TV stations as well as other appearances at national and private events on the island. She is preparing to release her first CD this summer. In September she will participate at the Song Festival in Egypt.

In 2006, Eleanor Cassar won the Malta International TV Song Festival with "Bniedem Iehor" by songwriters Paul Giordimaina and Fleur Balzan. Eventually, she represented Malta at the Universe Song Festival 2007 in Tenerife, Canary Islands (Spain) where she won the first prize, again.

References

1982 births
21st-century Maltese women singers
21st-century Maltese singers
Living people
Golden Stag winners